Unter Purkersdorf is a railway station serving Purkersdorf in Lower Austria. In 2019, commuters were bothered about the absence of information and shortage of rail replacement traffic after "technical ailments in Hütteldorf". ÖBB attempted to settle the issue promptly.

References 

Railway stations in Lower Austria
Austrian Federal Railways